Gyeongnam National University of Science and Technology (GNTECH) is a national university located in Jinju, South Korea.

External links 
Official site

Defunct universities and colleges in South Korea
Jinju
1910 establishments in Korea
Educational institutions established in 1910
2021 disestablishments in South Korea
Educational institutions disestablished in 2021